"Bacardi Feeling (Summer Dreamin')" is a song by American recording artist Kate Yanai. Initially a Bacardi Rum jingle that she recorded for the European market, it became so popular that Yanai was asked to transform it into a song about "summer love" rather than rum. Arnold McCuller, David Lasley and Valerie Carter served as backing vocalists on the track, which subsequently went to number-one in Austria and Germany.

Track listings
 CD maxi single
 "Bacardi Feeling (Summer Dreamin')" (Radio Version) – 3:30
 "Bacardi Feeling (Summer Dreamin')" (Cocktail Mix) – 5:33
 "Bacardi Feeling" (Original) – 3:10
 "Bacardi Feeling (Summer Dreamin')" (Instrumental) – 4:21

 7" single
 "Bacardi Feeling (Summer Dreamin')" (Radio Version) – 3:01
 "Bacardi Feeling" (Original) – 2:10

Charts

Weekly charts

Year-end charts

Cover version 

In 2012, the song was re-recorded by American singer Kelly Rowland with German production team Project B., consisting of Marek Pompetzki, Paul NZA, and Cecil Remmler, to promote Bacardi. An accompanying music video was filmed in Barcelona, Spain in June 2012.

Track listing 
CD maxi single
 "Summer Dreaming 2012" – 3:24
 "Summer Dreaming 2012" (TV Mix) – 3:22
 "Summer Dreaming 2012" (DJ Sergey Fisun Mix) – 3:13
 "Summer Dreaming 2012" (Berlin Heights Retro Mix) – 2:55
 "Summer Dreaming 2012" (Extended Mix) – 4:50

Charts

References

1991 singles
2012 singles
Kelly Rowland songs
1991 songs
Warner Records singles